The 1995–96 Taça de Portugal was the 57th edition of the Portuguese football knockout tournament organized by the Portuguese Football Federation. The 1995–96 Taça de Portugal began in September 1995 and concluded with the final at the Estádio Nacional on 18 May 1996.

Sporting CP were the previous holders, having defeated Marítimo 2–0 in the previous season's final. Benfica defeated Sporting 3–1 in the final to win their 23rd Taça de Portugal. As a result of them winning the domestic cup competition, Benfica faced 1995–96 Primeira Divisão winners Porto in the 1996 Supertaça Cândido de Oliveira.

Sixth round
Ties were played on the 31 January, whilst replays were played between the 7–14 February. Due to the odd number of teams involved at this stage of the competition, Olhanense qualified for the quarter-finals due to having no opponent to face at this stage of the competition.

Quarter-finals
Ties were played on the 25 February.

Semi-finals
Ties were played between the 10–24 April.

Final

References

Taça de Portugal seasons
Taca De Portugal, 1995-96
1995–96 domestic association football cups